The Irish House of Commons was the lower house of the Parliament of Ireland that existed from 1297 until 1800. The upper house was the House of Lords. The membership of the House of Commons was directly elected, but on a highly restrictive franchise, similar to the unreformed House of Commons in contemporary England and Great Britain. Catholics were disqualified from sitting in the Irish parliament from 1691, even though they comprised the vast majority of the Irish population.

The Irish executive, known as the Dublin Castle administration, under the Lord Lieutenant of Ireland, was not answerable to the House of Commons but to the British government. However, the Chief Secretary for Ireland was usually a member of the Irish parliament. In the Commons, business was presided over by the Speaker.

From 1 January 1801, it ceased to exist and was succeeded by the House of Commons of the United Kingdom.

Franchise
The limited franchise was exclusively male. From 1728 until 1793, Catholics were disfranchised, as well as being ineligible to sit in the Commons. Most of the population of all religions had no vote. In counties, forty-shilling freeholders were enfranchised while in most boroughs it was either only the members of self-electing corporations or a highly-restricted body of freemen that were eligible to vote for the borough's representatives. The vast majority of parliamentary boroughs were pocket boroughs, the private property of an aristocratic patron.

Abolition
The House of Commons was abolished under the Acts of Union 1800, which merged the Kingdom of Ireland into the Kingdom of Great Britain to form the United Kingdom of Great Britain and Ireland with effect from 1 January 1801. The Irish House of Commons sat for the last time in Parliament House, Dublin on 2 August 1800. One hundred of its members were designated or co-opted to sit with the House of Commons of Great Britain, forming the House of Commons of the United Kingdom. The patron of pocket boroughs that were disfranchised under the Act of Union was awarded £15,000 compensation for each.

Speaker of the Commons

The Speaker of the Irish House of Commons was the presiding officer of the House and its most senior official. The position was one of considerable power and prestige, and in the absence of a government chosen from and answerable to the Commons, he was the dominant political figure in the Parliament. The last Speaker was John Foster.

Constituencies

The number of boroughs invited to return members had originally been small (only 55 Boroughs existed in 1603) but was doubled by the Stuart monarchs. By the time of the Union, there were 150 constituencies, each electing two members:
 32 county constituencies;
 8 county borough constituencies;
 109 borough constituencies;
 Dublin University.

Following the Act of Union, from 1801, there were 100 MPs from Ireland in the House of Commons of the United Kingdom. The constituencies were adapted from those in the Irish House of Commons as follows:
 32 county constituencies, with two MPs each;
 2 county borough constituencies, Cork City and Dublin City, both with two MPs;
 31 county borough and borough constituencies, with one MP each;
 Dublin University, with one MP.

Notes

Means of resignation
Until 1793 members could not resign their seats. They could cease to be a member of the House in one of four ways:
 death,
 expulsion,
 taking Holy Orders, or
 being awarded a peerage and so a seat in the Irish House of Lords.
 Standing down at election to the House.

In 1793 a methodology for resignation was created, equivalent to the Crown Steward and Bailiff of the Chiltern Hundreds or the Manor of Northstead as a means of resignation from the British House of Commons. From that date, Irish members could be appointed to the Escheatorship of Munster, the Escheatorship of Leinster, the Escheatorship of Connaught or the Escheatorship of Ulster. Possession of one of these Crown offices, "office of profit under the Crown" with a 30-shilling salary, terminated one's membership of the House of Commons.

Notable members
Henry Grattan: Went on to serve as an Irish member of the United Kingdom House of Commons.
Boyle Roche: The "father" of Irish bulls
Hon. Arthur Wellesley: Later became Duke of Wellington, defeated Napoleon I at Waterloo, and served as Prime Minister of the United Kingdom. He represented his family borough of Trim, County Meath from 1790–98.
William Conolly: A past Speaker, Conolly was notable not just for his role in parliament but also for his great wealth that allowed him to build one of Ireland's greatest Georgian houses, Castletown House.
Nathaniel Clements: 1705–77 Government and Treasury Official, Managed extensive financial functions from 1720–77 on behalf of the Government, de facto Minister for Finance 1740–77, extensive property owner and developer. A major influence on the architecture of Georgian Dublin and the Irish Palladian Country house.
John Philpot Curran: Orator and wit, originator of the quotation "Eternal vigilance is the price of liberty".

See also
List of parliaments of Ireland
History of Ireland

References

Sources
 Mary Frances Cusack, Illustrated History of Ireland, Project Gutenberg
 
 
 
 
 Moody/Vaughan, A new history of Ireland, Oxford, 1986,  and

External links
 Members Name Search (Commons and Lords, 1692–1800) Irish Legislation Database, Queen's University Belfast
  History of the Irish Parliament: Constituencies Ulster Historical Foundation
 Journals of the House of Commons of Ireland (proceedings from 1613)
 Index page for 14 volumes at HathiTrust
 large (~1 GB) PDF scans of 21 volumes from Oireachtas library) Index Vol.1 Index Vol.2 Vol.2 Vol.3 Vol.4 Vol.5 Vol.6 Vol.7 Vol.8 Vol.9 Vol.10 Vol.11 Vol.12 Vol.13 Vol.14 Vol.15 Vol.16 Vol.17 Vol.17 (Appendix) Vol.18 Vol.19 Vol.19 (Appendix)

 
Commons
Defunct lower houses